Crotonyl-coenzyme A is an intermediate in the fermentation of butyric acid, and in the metabolism of lysine and tryptophan. It is important in the metabolism of fatty acids and amino acids.

Crotonyl-coA and reductases 
Before a 2007 report by Alber and coworkers, crotonyl-coA carboxylases and reductases (CCRs) were known for reducing crotonyl-coA to butyryl-coA. A report by Alber and coworkers concluded that a specific CCR homolog was able to reduce crotonyl-coA to (2S)-ethyl malonyl-coA which was a favorable reaction. The specific CCR homolog came from the bacterium Rhodobacter sphaeroides.

Role of Crotonyl-coA in Transcription 
Post-translational modification of histones either by acetylation or crotonylation is important for the active transcription of genes. Histone crotonylation is regulated by the concentration of crotonyl-coA which can change based on environmental cell conditions or genetic factors.

References

See also
 Crotonic acid
 Glutaryl-CoA dehydrogenase

Biomolecules
Metabolism
Thioesters of coenzyme A